Edmund Grey, 1st Earl of Kent, KB (26 October 141622 May 1490), English administrator, nobleman and magnate, was the son of Sir John Grey, KG and Constance Holland. His main residence was at Wrest near Silsoe, Bedfordshire.

Lineage

Through Constance Holland, he was great-grandson of John of Gaunt, 1st Duke of Lancaster, the third son of King Edward III of England, by his first wife, and thus grand-nephew of King Henry IV of England and Philippa of Lancaster.

Grey succeeded his grandfather Reginald Grey, 3rd Baron Grey de Ruthyn in 1440.

He married Lady Katherine Percy, who was also a great-granddaughter of John of Gaunt by his third wife, Katherine Swynford, and also a descendant of King Edward III of England through his second son, Lionel of Antwerp, 1st Duke of Clarence.

Knighthood

Edmund Grey was knighted following service in Aquitaine in October 1440.  He attended the royal council between 1456 and 1458. Active militarily in the Wars of the Roses, he especially played a decisive role in the Battle of Northampton by switching his allegiance from the Lancastrian to the Yorkist cause. For this action he was rewarded by Edward IV with a grant of the manor of Ampthill, ownership of which had come into dispute between Grey, Ralph Lord Cromwell and Henry Holland Duke of Exeter.

Treasurer of England

Edmund Grey's appointment as treasurer of England was enacted at Westminster on 24 June 1463 but Walter Blount succeeded him in November 1464. Edmund also held other high offices under Edward IV and Richard III.

On 5 July 1483, he was made a Knight of the Bath. In 1485, he was constable of Northampton Castle.

Earldom

He was created Earl of Kent on 30 May 1465, shortly after the marriage of his eldest son, Anthony, to the king's sister-in-law, Joan Woodville (she is sometimes known as Eleanor Woodville) He was then appointed chief justice of the county of Meryonnyth, North Wales  and constable of Harlech. After the death of their first son, the second, George, became his heir and eventually George Grey, 2nd Earl of Kent.

Posterity

His children by Katherine Percy included:
 Anthony Grey (died in his father's lifetime), married Eleanor Woodville sister of Elizabeth Woodville. There were no children
 George Grey, 2nd Earl of Kent, married Anne Woodville then Katherine Herbert, daughter of William Herbert, 1st Earl of Pembroke
 Elizabeth Grey, married Sir Robert Greystoke
 Anne Grey, married John Grey, 8th Baron Grey of Wilton

Notes

References
 

1416 births
1490 deaths
Lord High Treasurers of England
Earls of Kent (1465 creation)
People of the Tudor period
Edmund
Barons Grey of Ruthin
English knights
Knights Bachelor
Knights of the Bath